Stenoma elaeurga is a moth of the family Depressariidae. It is found in Bolivia.

The wingspan is about 23 mm. The forewings are light greyish ochreous, irregularly sprinkled olive fuscous, especially towards the base, on an oblique fascia before the middle, and beyond the subterminal line. The plical and first discal stigmata are obscurely darker, the second discal dark fuscous and distinct. There are three or four dots of dark olive-fuscous irroration towards the costa before the middle, a strongly excurved series of very undefined dots from beneath the costa before the middle around the second discal stigma to the middle of the dorsum, and a strongly angulated subterminal series of cloudy dots from the costa before two-thirds to the dorsum towards the tornus. There is also a marginal series of dark fuscous dots around the apex and termen. The hindwings are grey.

References

Moths described in 1925
Taxa named by Edward Meyrick
Stenoma